Agustín Moreno and Jaime Yzaga defeated Petr Korda and Cyril Suk in the final, 7–6(7–3), 6–4 to win the boys' doubles tennis title at the 1985 Wimbledon Championships.

Seeds

  Leonardo Lavalle /  Mihnea-Ion Năstase (first round)
  Petr Korda /  Cyril Suk (final)
  Grant Saacks /  Darryl Shapiro (quarterfinals)
  Brett Custer /  Patrick Flynn (semifinals)

Draw

Draw

References

External links

Boys' Doubles
Wimbledon Championship by year – Boys' doubles